Vulcaniella glaseri is a moth in the family Cosmopterigidae. It was described by Riedl in 1966. It is found in Turkey.

The wingspan is about 10 mm. Adults have been recorded in June and August.

References

Moths described in 1966
Vulcaniella
Endemic fauna of Turkey
Insects of Turkey